The Everlasting Mercy is a poem by John Masefield, the UK's second longest-serving poet laureate.

It was published in 1911, and is styled as the confession of a man who has turned from sin to Christianity. The work that first made Masefield famous, it shocked early 20th century British sensibilities with its direct, honest, and therefore often harsh language, as the life of protagonist violent, drunken womanizer Saul Kane is laid out in detail.

In Popular Media
In the third episode of the American TV series Peter Gunn, The Vicious Dog, the last line is the antagonist's, asked why he'd committed the crimes, responding with a quote from The Everlasting Mercy: 

1911 poems